Poni may refer to:

 Poni (province), Burkina Faso
 Poni Adams (born 1921), American actress
 Project on Nuclear Issues, a program hosted by the Center for Strategic and International Studies
 Domagoj Gavran, klošar bez bele nicknamed "Poni"
 Poni, an Albanian singer
 Petru Poni, Romanian chemist
 Matilda Cugler-Poni, Romanian poet and wife of Petru